James Yester (born November 24, 1939) is an American musician. He is a member of the sunshine pop group The Association, who had numerous hits on the Billboard charts during the 1960s, including "Windy", "Cherish", "Never My Love" and "Along Comes Mary", among many others. 

Yester was a core member of the Modern Folk Quartet, when they reformed in the 1980s. He is the older brother of former Lovin' Spoonful member Jerry Yester, and played briefly with that band in the 1990s.

Early life 
Jim Yester was born in Birmingham, Alabama and is the older brother of musician Jerry Yester. Yester's family moved to Burbank, California when he was three because his father wanted to get involved in the film industry. His father played the part of a band member in the film Fort Apache. The first concert Jim attended was a Fats Domino concert at the Olive Recreation Center. 

Growing up, Yester attended Notre Dame High School in Sherman Oaks, California and was a member of the Falconry club there. He learned how to play the harmonica and piano.

Early career 
He started playing the piano in clubs when he was 13.
Jim enlisted in the army in 1961 and was based in Germany. He was later discharged in 1964. When in the Army, he met two other troops who put together a comedy trio. When officers heard about the comedy trio, they pulled them out of combat so they could tour around France and Germany, entertaining soldiers:

Jim enlisted in the army in 1961 and was based in Germany. He was later discharged in 1964. When in the Army, he met two other troops who put together a comedy trio. After sending a tape to an entertainment director in Germany, the director pulled them out of combat so they could tour around France and Germany, entertaining soldiers:

Sometime in the late 1950s/early 1960s in Los Angeles, Jim and his brother Jerry performed as a folk duo called The Yester Brothers and were managed by Martin "Mutt" Cohen, who owned the Unicorn Coffee House. Mutt’s brother, Herbie, would later Manager the Modern Folk Quartet, a band both brothers would later be affiliated with.

The Association

1960s

In 1966, Yester was asked to join the group The Association after their original rhythm guitarist Bob Page left. The group rehearsed for six months and were eventually signed to Jubilee Records.   

During their short tenure with Jubilee Records, they recorded their first single "Babe I’m Gonna Leave You" (a song originally recorded by Joan Baez, later popularized by Led Zeppelin) and then recorded "One Too Many Mornings" (originally recorded by Bob Dylan in 1964), which was produced by Valiant's owner, Barry De Vorzon, at Gold Star Studios soon after. After a few months, they were given to Valiant Records.   

Their debut album And Then... Along Comes the Association was released in July. Two of the songs from the album, "Along Comes Mary" and "Cherish" charted on the Billboard Hot 100, with "Cherish" reaching number one.   Yester sang lead on "Along Comes Mary", a controversial song reputedly about marijuana. The band managed to convince Valiant to let Curt Boettcher produce the album for them. When the band were starting to garner a following, Yester was sharing a house with members Jules Alexander and Russ Giguere. Yester was one of the groups main songwriters.   

The group's other hits in the following years included "Windy", "Everything That Touches You", "Never My Love", and "Requiem for the Masses".   

In 1967, the band were the lead-off act at the Monterey International Pop Festival, however, the camera crew were still setting up equipment, meaning the first half of the group’s performance wasn’t filmed. The Association were regular guests on the variety show The Smothers Brothers Comedy Hour. The band is known for their harmonies and multiple lead vocalists, with Jim contributing on Tenor vocals, that can be heard on "Cherish".  He composed the title song for the movie Goodbye Columbus, which earned the Association a nomination for Best Original Song at the 1969  Golden Globe Awards.

1970s-1980s
Yester left the Association in 1973.  He returned a year later and stayed with the band for three years. In 1983 he left the Association again after returning to them in 1979.  In 1988, Yester joined the Modern Folk Quartet.

2000s-present
In 2003, the Association were inducted into the Vocal Group Hall of Fame, where the then-surviving members performed "Along Comes Mary" and "Windy".

Yester returned to the Association in 2007, and has been touring with founding member Jules Alexander since then. The Association are one of many acts that perform on the Happy Together tour, a tour of famous 1960s pop and folk groups such as The Turtles, Gary Puckett & The Union Gap and The Cowsills. 

Three songs by the Association have sold over one million copies and have been certified platinum discs: "Cherish", "Windy", and "Never My Love". 

The current lineup of the group consists of Yester (rhythm and lead guitar; 1965–1973, 1974–1977, 1979–1983, 2007-present), Jules Alexander (lead and rhythm guitar; 1965–1967, 1969–1974, 1979–1989, since 2012), Bruce Pictor (drums since 1985), Paul Holland (bass 1988-1999; rhythm and lead guitar since 2014), Del Ramos (brother of Association member Larry Ramos; bass since 1999) and Jordan Cole (son of Association member Brian Cole, keyboard since 1999).

Modern Folk Quartet 
Yester played in the reformed Modern Folk Quartet, from 1985 to 1991. Yester contributed to on their albums; Moonlight Serenade (1985), Live From Japan (1989), Bamboo Saloon (1990), MFQ Christmas (1990), and MFQ Wolfgang (1991).

The Lovin’ Spoonful 
In 1991, he also briefly joined his brother in the reunited Lovin’ Spoonful, a group known for hits such as "Do You Believe in Magic", "Summer in the City" and "Darlin' Be Home Soon".

Other works 
In 1978, Yester opened for Robin Williams as a solo artist at the Ice House (which by then had slowly shifted from a  music bar to a comedy club).

Yester left the Spoonful in 1994 and later joined with Bruce Belland of The Four Preps, and The Diamonds' Dave Somerville, to form YBS, who also bill themselves as the Three Tenors of Rock. YBS toured until Somerville’s death in 2015.

On July 28th 2013, Yester guest appeared with the ensemble, the YesterDaze.

Personal life 
Jim has two brothers; Ted and Jerry.  

He currently resides in Galloway Township, New Jersey, after previously living in Hollywood, Los Angeles from 1943 to 1989, and has a daughter.

Discography

The Association

Albums 
 And Then... Along Comes the Association (1966)
 Renaissance (1966)
 Insight Out (1967)
 Birthday (1968)
 The Association (1969)
 Stop Your Motor (1971)
 Waterbeds in Trinidad! (1972)

Singles

Modern Folk Quartet

Albums 

 Moonlight Seranade (1985)
 Live in Japan (1989)
 Bamboo Saloon (1990)
 MFQ Christmas (1990)
 MFQ Wolfgang (1991)

Singles 

 "Together to Tomorrow" / "Keepin' the Dream Alive" (1990)

YBS

Singles 

 Let’s Give Them Something to Talk About

References

External links 
 
 

1939 births
Living people
Notre Dame High School (Sherman Oaks, California) alumni
Musicians from Birmingham, Alabama
American rock guitarists
American rock musicians
American folk guitarists
American folk singers
Modern Folk Quartet members
The Association members
The Lovin' Spoonful members
Rhythm guitarists